Ceratomia is a genus of hawkmoths (family Sphingidae). The genus was erected by Thaddeus William Harris in 1839. Species include:

Species
Ceratomia amyntor (Geyer 1835)
Ceratomia catalpae (Boisduval 1875)
Ceratomia hageni Grote 1874
Ceratomia hoffmanni Mooser 1942
Ceratomia igualana Schaus, 1932
Ceratomia sonorensis Hodges 1971
Ceratomia undulosa (Walker 1856)

References

 
Sphingini
Moth genera
Taxa named by Thaddeus William Harris